Deymeh-ye Yaqub (also Romanized as Deymeh-ye Ya‘qūb; also known as Deymeh and Deymeh-ye Ḩamūd) is a village in Buzi Rural District, in the Central District of Shadegan County, Khuzestan Province, Iran. At the 2006 census, its population was 330, in 64 families.

References 

Populated places in Shadegan County